The UNSW Touch Club is a university based touch football Club that competes in a number of competitions, both at varsity and non-varsity representative level. At varsity level, the UNSW Touch Club represents the University of New South Wales at the Eastern University Games and Australian University Games. The Club also competes in the NSW Touch Vawdon Cup and NSW State Cup each year. The UNSW Touch Club is based at the David Phillips Memorial Fields, Daceyville NSW.

History
The UNSW Touch Club was founded in 1995.

Social Competition
The main attraction of the UNSW Touch Club is its successful Monday Night Social Competition. The competition is run bi-annually in line with the UNSW teaching period(s). The competition first started with a small six team competition, but in recent years has hit capacity at 50 teams playing in five divisions.

The competition is played between the hours of 6.00pm and 9.00pm at David Phillips Memorial Playing Fields, Daceyville (corner of Gwea Ave and Banks Ave).

University Games
At inter-varsity level, UNSW Touch compete at the Eastern University Games, a regional tournament held during Semester One for NSW & ACT universities, and at the Australian University Games, held during semester two.

Since first entering the Australian University Games in 1995, the club has won eight Australian University Games gold medals and six Eastern University Games gold. The most recent of these wins was in 2010 when the Men's and Women's sides both won their respective division one titles.

Results

Notable Achievements

In 2002, the UNSW Men's Touch side was named AUS-East University Team of the Year.

In 2006, the club's women's team won the silver medal at EUG played in Coffs Harbour, and in the name of consistency, again won silver at AUG's played in Adelaide. Up until this time, this was the farthest a UNSW women's team had progressed.

In 2007, the club won its first ever women's EUG title. Again the team proved consistent and won gold again at AUG's with a hard-fought win over Griffith University. At the same tournament the men's side took 4th place.

In 2008, both the Men's and Women's sides won gold at the Australian University Games, held in Melbourne. Both teams played Griffith University in the Grand Final.

In 2009 the UNSW Women's team was nominated for a prestigious UNSW Blues Award and was successful in winning, being announced Team of the Year.

External links
 UNSW Touch Website

Touch
Touch teams
University and college sports clubs in Australia